Giorgio Scarlatti (2 October 1921 – 26 July 1990) was a racing driver from Italy. He participated in 15 Formula One World Championship Grands Prix, debuting on 13 May 1956.

Scarlatti's best season in Formula One was as a works Maserati driver in 1957, when he finished sixth in the Pescara Grand Prix, narrowly missing out on the points-scoring positions when he was overtaken in the latter stages by Stuart Lewis-Evans. He later scored his only championship point when Harry Schell took over the Italian's Maserati 250F during the Italian Grand Prix and finished fifth.

Complete Formula One World Championship results
(key)

''* Indicates shared drive with Harry Schell

References

1921 births
1990 deaths
Italian racing drivers
Italian Formula One drivers
24 Hours of Le Mans drivers
Giorgio Scarlatti Formula One drivers
Scuderia Centro Sud Formula One drivers
Maserati Formula One drivers
Cooper Formula One drivers
Scuderia Serenissima Formula One drivers
World Sportscar Championship drivers